Jennifer E. Benson is an American former state legislator who served in the Massachusetts House of Representatives from January 2009 until January 2020, when she resigned to become President of Alliance for Business Leadership. She is a Lunenburg resident and a member of the Democratic Party.

References

Living people
Democratic Party members of the Massachusetts House of Representatives
People from Lunenburg, Massachusetts
Women state legislators in Massachusetts
21st-century American politicians
21st-century American women politicians
Year of birth missing (living people)